Ralph David Firman Jr. (born 20 May 1975) is a British-born former racing driver who raced under Irish citizenship (his mother Angela is from Ireland) and an Irish-issued racing licence. Earlier in his career he raced under a British licence. His father, Ralph Firman Sr., co-founded the Van Diemen racecar constructor with Ross Ambrose, father of V8 Supercars champion Marcos, then more recently founded RFR.  He is married to Aldís Kristín Árnadóttir, an Icelandic UK-educated lawyer. Ralph's sister, Natasha, is also a racing driver.

Career

Formula Three

Educated at Gresham's School between 1988 and 1993, Firman went straight into motor racing on leaving school. Despite leading much of the 1995 British F3 championship, he lost the title at the final round to Oliver Gavin. However, he continued in the championship in 1996 and captured the title at his second attempt.

Macau Grand Prix controversy
Firman won the prestigious Macau Grand Prix in 1996 under controversial circumstances. At the end of round 1, Firman finished ahead of German Formula 3 champion Jarno Trulli. In round 2, he was overtaken by Trulli on the last lap. Firman was running with a broken front wing. Just as Jarno Trulli was on the way to victory, Firman crashed at the hairpin corner, blocked the track and caused a red flag. The race officials counted the results to the previous lap when Firman was ahead of Trulli, thus giving him the win.

Formula Nippon
Firman then moved to Japan, culminating in the 2002 Formula Nippon championship, before returning to Europe.

Formula One

Firman secured a seat in Formula One for the  season at the Jordan team, alongside Giancarlo Fisichella. He participated in 14 Formula One Grands Prix, debuting at the 2003 Australian Grand Prix.  He scored one championship point, in the 2003 Spanish Grand Prix.  He was injured in a huge crash during practice for the 2003 Hungarian Grand Prix which forced him to sit out that and the next race, in which he was replaced by Zsolt Baumgartner.

In November 2003, Firman drove a Jordan-Ford EJ13 at Macau's Guia Circuit as part of the Macau Grand Prix's 50th anniversary celebrations, the first time that a contemporary F1 machine had been seen in action around the tight and tricky Guia circuit. Firman clocked an impressive 1:59.4 seconds lap, 13 seconds quicker than F3 poleman Fabio Carbone managed on the same day.

Post-Formula One

Firman has also competed in the 24 Hours of Le Mans, and was an official test driver for the A1 Grand Prix series in August 2004.

In August 2005, it was announced that he would be the driver for A1 Team Ireland. He had previously been seen to be in competition for the Great Britain seat.

In 2007, Firman, along with Daisuke Ito, won the Japan Super GT GT500 class championship with the Aguri Suzuki co-owned ARTA team. Firman and Ito won the championship before the final race of the season, a first in the series' competitive history.

Retirement from racing
Firman retired from racing in 2013, and now runs a British engineering company.

Racing career

Career summary

Complete Formula Nippon results
(key) (Races in bold indicate pole position) (Races in italics indicate fastest lap)

Complete JGTC/Super GT results

Complete Formula One results
(key)

Complete 24 Hours of Le Mans results

Complete A1 Grand Prix results
(key) (Races in bold indicate pole position) (Races in italics indicate fastest lap)

References

External links

GP Encyclopedia
RFR

1975 births
Living people
Sportspeople from Norwich
Irish racing drivers
Irish Formula One drivers
Jordan Formula One drivers
A1 Team Ireland drivers
Formula Nippon drivers
British Formula Three Championship drivers
24 Hours of Le Mans drivers
Super GT drivers
Karting World Championship drivers
People educated at Gresham's School
Status Grand Prix drivers
A1 Grand Prix drivers
Nakajima Racing drivers
Team Aguri drivers
Paul Stewart Racing drivers